In mathematics, the "strong law of small numbers" is the humorous law that proclaims, in the words of Richard K. Guy (1988):

In other words, any given small number appears in far more contexts than may seem reasonable, leading to many apparently surprising coincidences in mathematics, simply because small numbers appear so often and yet are so few. Earlier (1980) this "law" was reported by Martin Gardner. Guy's subsequent 1988 paper of the same title gives numerous examples in support of this thesis.  (This paper earned him the MAA Lester R. Ford Award.)

Second strong law of small numbers

Guy also formulated a second strong law of small numbers:

Guy explains this latter law by the way of examples: he cites numerous sequences for which observing the first few members may lead to a wrong guess about the generating formula or law for the sequence. Many of the examples are the observations of other mathematicians.

One example Guy gives is the conjecture that  is prime—in fact, a Mersenne prime—when  is prime; but this conjecture, while true for  = 2, 3, 5 and 7, fails for   = 11 (and for many other values).

Another relates to the prime number race: primes congruent to 3 modulo 4 appear to be more numerous than those congruent to 1; however this is false, and first ceases being true at 26861.

See also
 Insensitivity to sample size
 Law of large numbers (unrelated, but the origin of the name)
 Mathematical coincidence
 Pigeonhole principle
 Representativeness heuristic

Notes

External links
 
 
 
 

Mathematics papers
Mathematical humor
1988 documents
1988 in science
Works originally published in American magazines
Works originally published in science and technology magazines